Microctenopoma nanum, the dwarf ctenopoma, is a fish in the family Anabantidae found in southern Cameroon, Gabon, and the Congo Basin of Africa.  It grows to 8.0 cm in total length.

References

nanum
Fish described in 1896
Taxa named by Albert Günther